Counter Terrorism Command (CTC) or SO15 is a Specialist Operations branch within London's Metropolitan Police Service.  The Counter Terrorism Command was established as a result of the merging of the Anti-Terrorist Branch (SO13) and Special Branch (SO12) in October 2006, bringing together intelligence, operations, and investigative functions to form a single command.  CTC has over 1,500 police officers and staff, and a number of investigators based overseas and also hosts the Counter Terrorism Policing headquarters.

It originated in 1883 as the Irish Bureau, or Special Irish Branch as it became known, formed in 1883 at New Scotland Yard by the then Home Secretary Sir William Harcourt. It consisted of just 12 detectives aiming to defeat the "Fenian" terrorist campaign that had been on-going in London and across the country. As of November 2013 the current form of CTC comprised 1790 staff including 1350 police officers and 600 detectives working in 75 specialist units with the capability to respond proactively or reactively anywhere in the world.

Responsibilities 
According to Counter Terrorism Command's website, the Command’s overriding priority is to keep the public safe and to disrupt terrorist-related activity in the United Kingdom and against UK interests overseas by:

 Detecting, investigating, and preventing terrorist threats and networks.
 Working with partner agencies to acquire and use intelligence and evidence about terrorism and extremism.
 Ensuring that Counter Terrorism Command activity is focused, delivering value for money, productivity and an efficient and effective use of our resources.
 Engaging, building and maintaining working relationships with boroughs, local communities, national and international partners to better understand their needs and to use their expertise and experience in jointly combating the terrorist threat.
 Working with communities, partners, institutions, groups and other agencies providing advice and support to tackle the ideologies that drive terrorism and extremism.
 Supporting, working and collaborating within the Counter Terrorism Policing network.
The Counter Terrorism Command has a number of other national security functions. It deals with sensitive national security investigations, such as Official Secrets Act enquiries, the investigation of war crimes (effectively making it the successor to the Met's War Crimes Unit) and crimes against humanity, and politically motivated murders.

Counter Terrorism Command is part of the Counter Terrorism Policing network.   It is overseen by the counter-terrorism coordination committee, chaired by Assistant Commissioner Matt Jukes of the Metropolitan Police Service.  As part of its role in the Counter Terrorism Policing network, SO15 operate against the threat of terrorism at a local, national, and international level and engages with a range of partners to prevent terrorist related activity, including the Security Service (MI5) and Secret Intelligence Service (MI6).

Known operations 
In its present form Counter Terrorism Command has been responsible for investigating several high-profile terrorist incidents, including:

 Transatlantic flight bomb plot (2006)
 Cargo planes bomb plot or "Printer bomb" (2010)
 2017 Westminster attack 
 Manchester Arena bombing (2017)
 2017 London Bridge attack
 Poisoning of Sergei and Yulia Skripal, 2018 Amesbury poisonings
 2020 Forbury Gardens stabbings
Murder of David Amess (2021)
Liverpool Women's Hospital bombing (2021)

Through the International Operations branch of Counter Terrorism Command, SO15 has proactively deployed officers around the world as well as in response to terrorist incidents in support of host countries and to investigate when British nationals are the victims of acts of terrorism. Such investigations include:
 Kidnap of Judith Tebbutt and the murder of David Tebbutt in Kenya (2012)
 In Amenas siege (2013)
 Westgate siege in Nairobi (2013)
 Sousse attacks in Tunisia (2015)

Heads 
This position is formally known as Head of the Metropolitan Police's Counter Terrorism Command, and is given the title Commander or Acting Commander.

See also 
 Joint Terrorism Analysis Centre
 Counter Terrorism Policing
 MI5
 MI6
 National Counter Terrorism Security Office

References

External links 
 Counter Terrorism Policing

Metropolitan Police units
British intelligence agencies
2006 establishments in the United Kingdom
Organizations established in 2006
Counterterrorism in the United Kingdom